Ognjen Lekić (born 7 January 1982) is a Serbian professional footballer. As he grow in France, he also holds a French passport.

Born in Šabac, SR Serbia, SFR Yugoslavia, he had previously played with Serbian clubs Vojvodina, Zemun, Zmaj Zemun, Železnik and Mačva Šabac, Israeli Hapoel Tel Aviv and Maccabi Petah Tikva, Hungarian Sopron Slovenian Primorje, Celje and Krka, Romanian FCM Turda, and Cypriot Aris Limassol F.C.

References

External links
Early career stats at Srbijafudbal
Middle career stats at Srbijafudbal

Living people
1982 births
Sportspeople from Šabac
Serbian footballers
Association football midfielders
FK Vojvodina players
FK Zemun players
FK Železnik players
FK Mačva Šabac players
Slovenian PrvaLiga players
FK Proleter Novi Sad players
Serbian expatriate footballers
Expatriate footballers in Israel
Hapoel Tel Aviv F.C. players
Expatriate footballers in Hungary
FC Sopron players
Expatriate footballers in Slovenia
NK Primorje players
NK Celje players
NK Krka players
Expatriate footballers in Cyprus
Aris Limassol FC players
Cypriot First Division players
Expatriate footballers in Bosnia and Herzegovina
FK Leotar players
Liga II players
ACS Sticla Arieșul Turda players
Expatriate footballers in Romania